= Marriage (Wy album) =

Studio album by Wy
- Released: May 7, 2021

Wy chronology
| Softie (2019) | Marriage (2021) |

Marriage is the third album by the Swedish wave pop duo Wy consisting of Ebba and Michel Gustafsson Ågren. The album was released on 7 May 2021 under Rama Lama Records and follows the duo's 2019 album, Softie. Singles “Come Here”, “Dream House”, and “That Picture of Me” were released prior to its release. Although the recording of the album was planned to take place with outside help and entirely in a studio, because of COVID-19, it was created entirely by the duo.

== Critical reception ==
Professional ratings
Review scores
| Source | Rating |
|---|---|
| Beats Per Minute | 7/10 |

Ray Finlayson writing for Beats Per Minute said that the lyrics were like "honest conversations between Ebba Gustafsson Ågren and her bandmate/husband Michel Gustafsson Ågren".
